Thiobarbituric acid is an organic compound and a heterocycle. It is used as a reagent in assaying malondialdehyde (the TBARS assay of lipid peroxidation).

It is also used in Kodak Fogging Developer FD-70, part of the Kodak Direct Positive Film Developing Outfit for making black and white slides (positives).

References 

Thiobarbiturates